Jendrassik is a surname. Notable people with the surname include:

Ernő Jendrassik (1858–1921), Hungarian physician
György Jendrassik (1898–1954), Hungarian physicist and mechanical engineer
Jenő Jendrassik (1860–1919), Hungarian painter

See also 
Jendrassik Cs-1, was the world's first working turboprop engine
Jendrassik maneuver, Medical treatment